"Wonderboy" (sometimes spelled "Wonder Boy") is a song by the English rock band the Kinks, released as a single in 1968. It stalled at number 36 in the UK charts, becoming the band's first single not to make the UK Top Twenty since their early covers. Despite this, it became a favourite of John Lennon of the Beatles, and, according to Ray Davies in his autobiography, X-Ray, "someone had seen John Lennon in a club and he kept on asking the disc jockey to play 'Wonder Boy' over and over again." Kinks guitarist Dave Davies praised the song, saying, Wonderboy' was a big one for us although it wasn't a hit. That was one song we really felt something for." However, bassist Peter Quaife's opinion towards the track was low, later stating that "[I] hated it ... it was horrible."

It peaked at number six in the Netherlands. It also reached number fifteen on the Tio i Topp chart in Sweden. "Wonderboy" was also released as a single in the US but failed to chart. It was one of several US non-LP singles tracks that made its album debut on the US-only released compilation The Kink Kronikles.

The single made its first time stereo appearance on the Golden Hour budget series "Golden Hour Of The Kinks", with Ray's lead vocal buried in the mix. The few subsequent reissues of the stereo mix (on the 3-CD The Kinks Are the Village Green Preservation Society set) continues to use this unusual mix.

Background and recording 

Ray Davies composed "Wonderboy" over a single night in March1968, during which he later recalled drinking an entire bottle of vodka. The song's composition coincided with his and his wife Rasa's attempts at conceiving a second child, which Ray hoped would be a boy.

The Kinks recorded "Wonderboy" in March1968 during the sessions for their 1968 album The Kinks Are the Village Green Preservation Society. Recording took place in Pye Studio 2, one of two basement studios at Pye Records' London offices. Ray produced the song, while one of Pye's in-house engineer operated the four-track mixing console, likely Brian Humphires. Supplementing the Kinks' regular line-up was Rasa, who contributed backing vocals; the band's regular session keyboardist Nicky Hopkins, who played piano; and the band's road manager Ken Jones, who played bongos.

Release and reception 

In the last week of March1968, Ray selected "Wonderboy" from the Kinks' backlog of recorded material to be the band's next single. Prominent advertisements in all British weekly magazines accompanied the release, but the song was the band's worst performing British single since "You Still Want Me" in early 1964. It reached  on Record Retailer chart, and it did not appear on Melody Maker chart. The failure ended the band's streak of twelve consecutive top 20 hits, the last five of which had made it to the top five. The single sold 26,000 copies, roughly one-ninth of each of the band's two UK singles from the previous year, "Waterloo Sunset" and "Autumn Almanac".

"Wonderboy" was well received by British music critics. A reviewer in Record Mirror magazine wrote that the Kinks had managed to "come up with something which is so darned catchy that one cannot help humming along with it". The writer characterised the song as "[p]hilosophy-pop" and resolved that it was not the Kinks' best work, but only because of the band's high standards. Derek Johnson of New Musical Express called it a "charming philosophic song", displaying Ray's "incredible flair for writing lyrics of a beautifully descriptive nature". Johnson concluded that the song was more commercial than either "Waterloo Sunset" or "Autumn Almanac" and predicted it would be a big hit, as did Melody Maker reviewer.

The single was advertised on part of a full-page ad in Billboard magazine and was reviewed in its Special Merit category, indicating that the magazine did not expect it to reach the top 60. Billboard critic characterised the song as an "infectious rocker loaded with teen appeal", leading Kinks researcher Doug Hinman to suspect that the reviewer had not actually listened to the record. While the Kinks' singles had sold well in the US up to 1966, their 1967 singles "Mister Pleasant" and "Waterloo Sunset" were commercial disappointments. By the time "Autumn Almanac" was released in late1967, American record stores had generally stopped stocking the band's singles. As a result, "Wonderboy" did not chart in the US and received little airplay.

Charts

Personnel 
According to band researcher Doug Hinman:

The Kinks
Ray Davies lead vocal, guitar
Dave Davies backing vocal, electric guitar
Pete Quaife backing vocal, bass
Mick Avory drums

Additional musicians
Rasa Davies backing vocal
Nicky Hopkins piano
Ken Jones bongos

Notes

References

Sources

External links 
 

The Kinks songs
1968 singles
Songs written by Ray Davies
Pye Records singles
1968 songs